is a 1963 Japanese animated adventure comedy-drama film directed by Akira Daikubara while distributed by Toei Company, Ltd. The film premiered in the same year as another Toei Animation production, Wolf Boy Ken. An apprentice around this time, a pre-fame Hayao Miyazaki worked on in-betweens during the production phase as his first animation gig. The film was released in Japan by Toei on December 21, 1963.

Plot 
An Akita puppy named Rock lives in a secluded cabin with his mother Shiro, a protector beloved by the forest animals. One winter night, a wily fox named Akamimi challenges Shiro and leads her to a mountain belonging to his boss Killer, a notorious tiger, who attacks her. In the spring, Rock mourns the loss of his mother and vows to get revenge.

He travels to a city and finds a troupe of street dogs, who agree to help him. Rumor spreads back to the forest that Rock has raised a large army to challenge Killer, so he dispatches Akamimi to send Rock out to sea in a barrel. A girl rescues him, however, and Rock lives with her. Meanwhile, the forest animals––including Killer and Akamimi––are captured and put into the city zoo. Word reaches Rock, now an adult, that Killer is still capable of terrorizing the other animals, so he travels back to the city and rejoins his gang. Together with his forest friends, they summon dogs from around town and challenge the large zoo animals. Eventually, Rock and Killer duel on a speeding rollercoaster, and Killer plummets to the ground. With everyone free from danger, the dogs march down a city street in celebration.

Cast 
 Rokku/Girl in the lighthouse - Aki Hori
 Shiro - Mizuki Ranoko
 Karu - Kitagawa Mari
 Goro - Hideo Sato
 Nukiya - Sakae Umezu
 Killer - Akira Nishimura
 Akamimi - Kamo Kikuhisa
 Rabbit - Makiko Ito
 Ron - Kazuko Yoshikawa
 Rima - Kiyoko Yamamoto
 Stray Dogs - Hanazawa Tokuho, Unno Yori, and Nishito Taika

See also
List of animated feature films of the 1960s

References

External links

Wan Wan Chuushingura webpage''

1963 films
1963 anime films
Japanese animated films
Toei Animation films